A Gun for Jennifer is a 1997 rape and revenge film thriller film directed by Todd Morris and starring Deborah Twiss.  It follows a feminist vigilante group who castrate suspected rapists and batterers while a female police officer attempts to stop them. It is shot in a retro grindhouse style and premiered at the Fantasia Festival in July 1997, where it was sold-out an hour before screening and received a standing ovation. The film has not left the festival circuit; Fangoria reported that it had been picked up for distribution by Mondo Macabro, but the release never came to fruition.

The movie was covered in the documentary In the Belly of the Beast, which detailed Morris and Twiss's discovery that their financier (whom Twiss had met while working as an exotic dancer) had been embezzling money.

Cast
Deborah Twiss as Jennifer / Allison
Benja Kay as Dt. Billie Perez
Rene Alberta as Becky
Tracy Dillon as Grace
Freida Hoops as Jesse
Veronica Cruz as Priscilla
Sheila Schmidt as Trish
Beth Dodye Bass as Annie
Joe Pallister as Grady (as Joseph Pallister)
Arthur J. Nascarella as Lt. Rizzo (as Arthur Nascarella)
Carl Jasper as Carl Varna
James O'Donoghue as Det. Cahill
Douglas Gorenstein as Snake
Raymond Chan as Skeletor
Lord Kayson as T-Bone
Fatmir Haskaj as Josh

References

External links
 
 
 

1997 films
1997 thriller films
American erotic thriller films
American rape and revenge films
American independent films
1990s feminist films
1990s exploitation films
1997 independent films
1990s English-language films
1990s American films